Glen Rock is one of two railroad stations operated by New Jersey Transit in the borough of Glen Rock, Bergen County, New Jersey, United States. Located on the Main Line, the station is signed as Glen Rock–Main Line to differentiate it from the Glen Rock–Boro Hall station, which lies two blocks east on Rock Road (County Route 134) on the Bergen County Line.

History 

Service at Glen Rock began on October 19, 1848, with the opening of the Paterson and Ramapo Railroad, which connected the Erie Railroad at Suffern to the Paterson and Hudson River Railroad in Paterson. At that time, the station was known as Rock Road. The Erie Railroad, who took control of the Paterson and Ramapo, also opened a second station in Glen Rock, known as Ferndale in 1894. 

Located at Ferndale Avenue south of the Rock Road station, a railroad terminal was built at Ferndale and served as the yard for the Newark Branch of the Erie in 1902. The Erie discontinued that in 1903 when they finished the yard in Waldwick. The current station depot was finished in November 1905.

Station layout
The station has two tracks, each with a low-level side platform. The station is not compliant with the Americans with Disabilities Act of 1990.

References

External links

 Station from Rock Road from Google Maps Street View

NJ Transit Rail Operations stations
Railway stations in the United States opened in 1848
Former Erie Railroad stations
Railway stations in Bergen County, New Jersey
1848 establishments in New Jersey